Late Tang may refer to:

 The later years of imperial China's Tang dynasty (618–907)
 Later Tang (923–937), a short-lived dynasty during imperial China's Five Dynasties and Ten Kingdoms period